(born ; January 6, 1981) is a Japanese actress. She was the first Japanese actress to be nominated for an Academy Award in 50 years, for her work in Babel (2006). Kikuchi's other notable films include Norwegian Wood (2010), which screened in competition at the 67th Venice Film Festival and Guillermo del Toro's science fiction action film Pacific Rim (2013). For her role in the drama film Kumiko, the Treasure Hunter (2014), Kikuchi received an Independent Spirit Award nomination for Best Female Lead. In 2022, she starred in the HBO Max crime drama series Tokyo Vice.

Early life
Kikuchi was born on January 6, 1981, in Hadano, Kanagawa, the youngest of three children. She was discovered by a talent agent on the street at the age of 15.

Career
Kikuchi made her debut in 1999, under her birth name, Yuriko Kikuchi, with the Kaneto Shindo film Will to Live. Soon after, in 2001, she starred in the celebrated Kazuyoshi Komuri film , which was featured at several international festivals, including the Rotterdam Film Festival. In 2004, Kikuchi appeared in the well-received Katsuhito Ishii film The Taste of Tea, which was selected for the Cannes Film Festival.

In 2006, Kikuchi was chosen by Japanese film producer Yoko Narahashi for the Alejandro González Iñárritu film Babel, where she played Chieko Wataya, a troubled, deaf teenage girl, for which she received international attention. She was nominated for the Academy Award for Best Supporting Actress. Kikuchi was the fourth person in Academy Award history to be nominated for a role in which she does not speak. She won several awards, such as the National Board of Review Award for Best Breakthrough Female Performance (tying with Jennifer Hudson) and the Gotham Independent Film Award for Breakthrough Actor.

She has appeared in two of Mamoru Oshii's films: The Sky Crawlers (2008) and Assault Girls (2009). Kikuchi starred in Rian Johnson's second film, The Brothers Bloom (2009), which was her first full English-language feature. Though she plays a main character, she only speaks three words; her character is said to only know three words of English.

In 2010, Kikuchi was cast as Naoko in Tran Anh Hung's adaptation of Haruki Murakami's novel Norwegian Wood. In March 2011, she was added to the cast of 47 Ronin, the first English-language adaptation of the Chushingura legend, Japan's most famous tale of samurai loyalty and revenge. Kikuchi described her villain character to the American version of Glamour as "a real bitch." In 2013, she appears in Pacific Rim, having improved her English by watching the American television series The Voice. 

In 2014, Kikuchi starred in Kumiko, the Treasure Hunter, directed by David Zellner. Kikuchi was cast in the Season 2 of the HBO science fiction series Westworld.

Kikuchi plays the role of Eimi Maruyama, the supervisor of the lead character Jake Adelstein, in the 2022 HBO Max series Tokyo Vice. In August 2022, she portrayed a taxi driver in the music video for Mondo Grosso's "Crypt".

Personal life
After meeting in 2009, Kikuchi was in a two-year relationship with director Spike Jonze, with whom she briefly resided in New York.

Kikuchi married Japanese actor Shōta Sometani on December 31, 2014. In October 2016, Kikuchi gave birth to their first child. Their second child was born in late 2018.

Filmography

Film

Television

Awards and nominations

References

Further reading

External links

 

1981 births
Living people
People from Hadano, Kanagawa
Actresses from Kanagawa Prefecture
20th-century Japanese actresses
21st-century Japanese actresses
Japanese film actresses
Japanese stage actresses
Japanese television actresses